Tropical Forest Research Institute (TFRI)  is a Research institute situated in Jabalpur in Madhya Pradesh. It works under the Indian Council of Forestry Research and Education (ICFRE) of  the Ministry of Environment, Forest and Climate Change, Government of India.

Divisions
 Agro-Forestry 
 Biodiversity and Sustainable Management
 Tropical forest Ecology and Rehabilitation
 Forest Entomology
 Forest Pathology 
 Genetics and Plant Propagation
 Non Wood Forest Produce
 Silviculture and Joint Forest Management
 Extension

Thrust areas of research
 Biodiversity assessment, conservation and development
 Sustainable forest management
 Planting stock improvement
 Climate change
 Environmental amelioration
 Forest products development
 Biofuels from forests
 Development of agroforestry models
 Forest protection
 Forest extension

See also
 Indian Council of Forestry Research and Education
 List of Environment and Forest Research Institutes in India
 Van Vigyan Kendra (VVK) Forest Science Centres

References

Indian forest research institutes
Indian Council of Forestry Research and Education
Ministry of Environment, Forest and Climate Change
Research institutes in Madhya Pradesh
Education in Jabalpur
1988 establishments in Madhya Pradesh
Research institutes established in 1988
Environmental organisations based in India